Martin Mehkek (7 August 1936; Novačka – 1 July 2014; Koprivnica) was a Croatian painter. His works can be found at the Croatian Museum of Naïve Art in Zagreb.

References

Croatian painters
1936 births
2014 deaths